The Kazakhstani Women's Cup 2015 was the 9th season of the cup competition, Kazakhstan's second-most important title in women's football.

BIIK-Kazygurt won their eighth title after beating Kokshe 6–1 in the final.

Results

Group stage

Group A

Group B

Match for the 5th place

Bronze medal match

Final

Top scorers
Final statistics

References

Women's football competitions in Kazakhstan